The Swin is a passage in the Thames estuary between Maplin Sands, Foulness Sand and Gunfleet Sand northwest and the Barrow and Sunk sand ridges (shoals), southeast.  The Swin was used by barges and leisure craft from the Essex rivers, and coasters and colliers from Hull, Great Grimsby, North East England, Edinburgh and other similar sets of trading ports.

In 1874 R.M. Ballantyne wrote: 

The channel is formed of a series of deep water passages through sandbanks. Approaching from the northeast craft enter the East Swin between NE Gunfleet and Sunk Head Tower buoys. Craft may also pass down the parallel Wallet channel and cross into the East Swin at the Spitway. Shallower draught craft, such as the traditional Thames sailing barges, may continue on down the East Swin and cross the Middle Sands directly into the West Swin at Maplin Edge. The southeastern end of the West Swin joins the main Thames channels.

Etymology, pronunciation and orthography
It is an Old English word swin: a creek a channel. It was recorded in contemporary orthography of local writers as Swyn in 1365; a related word 'zwin' occurs in Dutch. It was thus not a sound liable to the Great Vowel Shift.

Scope and soundings

To explain the numbers on the inset map a depth of 11 is a formula of six feet (i.e. one fathom) and 1 foot. It is  fathoms. This excerpt shows clearly the detailed shallows which affect vessels of greater draught such as ships most severely.

Citations

References 
 
 
 
 
 
 
 

Thames Estuary
Coastal environment of Essex
Landforms of Essex